The Waxhaws is a geographical region extending beyond both sides of the border between what now is North Carolina and South Carolina, United States. It encompasses the areas currently known as Lancaster, Union and Mecklenburg counties. The name is derived from that of the Indigenous people who first inhabited the landbase, the Waxhaw people. Much of the area is now the territory of the Catawba Indian Nation.

Geography 
The region known as the "Waxhaws" is located in the Piedmont region of North Carolina and South Carolina. It lies southwest of the Uwharrie Mountains. The region encompasses an area just south of Charlotte, North Carolina, to Lancaster, South Carolina; and from Monroe, North Carolina, in the east to the Catawba River in the west. The region is generally forested and hilly, but not mountainous. One town in the region has adopted the Waxhaw name. Waxhaw, North Carolina incorporated its government in 1889. The town is only one site in the entire region, however, and is differentiated from the "Waxhaws" region mentioned in many historical records.

History 

Originally known to Europeans as the Waxhaw Settlement, the region was named for its first inhabitants, the Waxhaw people. The Waxhaw tribe had been almost annihilated by Eurasian infectious diseases following their first contact with European settlers. Those who remained were killed or dispersed during the Yamasee War of 1715. Around the year 1740, Irish, Scots-Irish, and German colonists began to move into The Waxhaws region and to establish farms. What is now the Old Waxhaw Presbyterian Church was built in 1752. 

During the American Revolutionary War, under the command of Colonel William Davie, Patriot militiamen were active in The Waxhaws. In 1781, the British forces of General Charles Cornwallis briefly occupied the town of Charlotte, North Carolina, already the largest town in the region, but his garrison was soon driven out by the local militia. Cornwallis later wrote that Charlotte was "a hornet's nest of rebellion", and Charlotte still is nicknamed, "The Hornet's Nest". The region's most important battle during the American Revolution did not involve locals. 

During the Battle of Waxhaws, a Loyalist cavalry force led by Banastre Tarleton easily defeated a force of approximately 350 Virginian Continentals under Abraham Buford, many of whom were killed as they were trying to surrender. The site of the battle is now the town of Buford, South Carolina, however. The seventh president of the United States, Andrew Jackson, was born and raised in The Waxhaws region. At the time of his birth, a border between the Carolinas did not exist. The exact site of his birth is uncertain. 

Later in life, perhaps for political reasons, Jackson claimed he was born on the South Carolina side of the new border, however, a midwife reportedly birthed Jackson in a cabin north of the border. The eleventh president of the United States, James K. Polk, who took office on March 4, 1845, also was born in The Waxhaws region. His birthplace is now Pineville, North Carolina. During the American Civil War, in 1864, Major General William Tecumseh Sherman's army came through parts of the region.

References

External links 
Museum of The Waxhaws and Andrew Jackson Memorial

Regions of South Carolina
Regions of North Carolina